SFR (Société française du radiotéléphone) is a French telecommunications company It is the second oldest mobile network operator in France, after Orange and the second largest telecommunications company in France, behind Orange.

As of December 2015, it had 21.9 million customers in Metropolitan France for mobile services, and provided 6.35 million households with high-speed internet access.

SFR also offers services in the overseas departments of France, in the Caribbean islands of Martinique, Guadeloupe, and in Guyane through SFR Caraïbe, as well as in the Indian Ocean, in Mayotte and the Réunion islands through SRR (Société Réunionnaise du Radiotéléphone), although the company is branded as SFR Réunion.

SFR (SFR Belux) operated in Belgium as a cable operator and MVNO in some communes of Brussels Region and in some areas of Luxembourg. The division was sold to rival Telenet (owned by Liberty Global) in December 2016.

History
SFR was founded as a company in 1987 in order for its parent company Compagnie Générale des Eaux (CGE) to start offering a 1G mobile phone service using the modified Nordic telecommunications standard NMT-F, to be operated in competition with the then-telephony incumbent France Télécom's Radiocom 2000 (fr) network. SFR also became the second French mobile network operator (after France Télécom) to launch 2G GSM services, which it did on 15 November 1992.

Vodafone had a 44% share in SFR until April 2011, when it sold its entire share back to SFR's founder parent company Vivendi. SFR is a major partner network of Vodafone in France.

Vivendi announced in March 2014 that it planned to sell its SFR division. On 14 March, Vivendi announced that it would enter exclusive negotiations with Altice/Numericable, to the exclusion of Bouygues and Iliad. Arnaud Montebourg, the French Minister for Industrial Renewal, provoked a storm when he stated that the Numericable/SFR deal was a certainty. Iliad lost 7.5% of its market value on that day.

SFR having 28.6 million subscribers versus 1,7 million for Numericable and much more notoriety, Patrick Drahi announced that SFR will replace Numericable. In late 2015, Numericable Outremer became SFR Caraïbe. On 15 February 2016, Numericable was rebranded as SFR in Belgium and Luxembourg, with the launch of new packages and the SVOD service Zive.

In February 2016 Orange, SFR and Free announced the purchase of their competitor Bouygues Telecom. However, negotiations for the purchase agreement fell through a few months later.

In December 2016, Altice sold SFR Belux to Telenet. SFR was merged in Belgium with Telenet on 31 March 2019 ; and SFR Luxembourg merged with Eltrona on 1 April 2020.

Slogans
2022: "Soyez vous" (Translation : "Be you")

1987-1990: "Parce qu’un abonné SFR n’est pas qu’un simple numéro"
1990-1994: "Ligne SFR, Le téléphone liberté"
1994-1996: "SFR, Le monde sans fil est à vous"
1996-1999: "Sans fil SFR, le monde est à vous"
1999-2000: "Vous n'avez pas fini d'être LIBRE"
2000-2001: "SFR, le meilleur réseau"
2001-2003: "Vous serez toujours plus qu’un simple numéro"
2003-2005: "Plus de plaisir"
2005-2007: "Parlons mieux, parlons mobile"
2007-2008: "Vivons mobile"
2008-2010: "SFR, et le monde est à vous"
2010-2014: "Carrément vous"
2014-2015: "Smart comme vous"
2015-2016: "SFR, et tout s'accélère"
2016-2017: "#NewSFR"
2017: "Pour vous, SFR change"
2017-2018: "SFR, en chemin vers le meilleur"
2018: "SFR, enjoy"

SFR TV
SFR TV is a television service accessible on La Box de SFR and La Box Fibre de SFR, which delivers television programs via the broadband internet telephone network (xDSL), high-speed internet (FTTH or FTTB fiber within Numericable). The service was also broadcast by satellite with SFR Sat available on the Astra 19.2°E satellite until October 2015.

The SFR TV package includes more than 200 channels, some pay-tv channels can be added as an option, by subscribing to a specific paid package, classified by theme (sport, youth, music, international ...).

On 17 November 2015, Numericable-SFR launched its SVOD service Zive, for the Power bouquet subscribers. Zive and Power packages became SFR Play in 2016.

Altice signed an exclusive agreement with Discovery and NBCUniversal in December 2016. The premium movies and series TV channel Altice Studio was launched on 22 August 2017.

The Numericable and SFR channels numbering were merged on 22 August 2017, and in 2019, the Numericable exclusive channels (MTV, Nickelodeon, J-One, Série Club, Cartoon Network...) were added to SFR ADSL offer. The brand Numericable disappeared.

SFR Sport
RMC Sport (formerly SFR Sport) is a package of French TV channels (RMC Sport 1, RMC Sport 2, RMC Sport 3, RMC Sport 4, RMC Sport 1UHD) from the SFR Group devoted to sports. They are available for SFR, Canal+, My.T and OTT subscribers.

In 2016, Altice acquired the rights of many sports competitions (Premier League, Liga NOS, Champions League) to form its SFR Sport bouquet. MCS, MCS Extrême and Kombat Sport were rebranded as SFR Sport 2, SFR Sport 3 and SFR Sport 5 ; and SFR Sport 1 and 4K were launched. The SFR Sport bouquet became RMC Sport on 3 July 2018.

See also

Telecommunications in France
Altice Studio
Meo

References

External links
 
 
 Corporate website of Altice France
 SFR Reunion
 SFR Mayotte
 SFR Caraïbe
 SFR Belgium (archive)
 SFR Luxembourg (archive)
 SFR Jeunes Talents – SFR's initiative to help promote and discover new talents on mobile and web

Altice (company)
Altice France
Telecommunications companies of France
Mobile phone companies of France
Multinational companies headquartered in France
Internet service providers of France
French brands
French business families
Telecommunications companies established in 1987
1987 establishments in France
Former Vivendi subsidiaries
2014 mergers and acquisitions